The 1935 Labour Party leadership election took place on 26 November 1935 when Herbert Morrison and Arthur Greenwood challenged Clement Attlee, the incumbent party leader of only one month and one day. Attlee, previously Deputy Leader, had been appointed as an interim leader the previous month when George Lansbury resigned and the general election was looming.

With the Labour Party now having roughly three times as many MPs as in the 1931-5 Parliament, both Morrison and Greenwood stood in the annual election for leader, feeling that Attlee's appointment had only been intended as an interim measure. Morrison had not been an MP at the time of the October appointment, whilst Greenwood had declined to offer himself as a candidate then because he was strongly associated with trade union leaders such as Ernest Bevin, who were widely regarded as the reasons for forcing Lansbury to resign, a move that the vast majority of Labour MPs opposed.

Candidates
Clement Attlee, incumbent interim Leader of the Labour Party, Member of Parliament for Limehouse
Arthur Greenwood, former Minister of Health, Member of Parliament for Wakefield
Herbert Morrison, Leader of the London County Council, Member of Parliament for Hackney South

Results
The first round of the contest took place on 26 November 1935:

As the lowest-placed candidate, Greenwood was eliminated from the race.

The second contest took place on 3 December:

With a clear majority, Attlee retained the party leadership.

Herbert Morrison later claimed that he was denied the leadership of the Labour Party in the 1935 election by the votes of Labour MPs who were members of New Welcome Lodge.  Morrison's backer Hugh Dalton made similar claims, and went further than Morrison by claiming to have been shown the summons for the meeting at which the voting was decided.  
Dalton believed that the members of New Welcome Lodge backed Arthur Greenwood, who was a member of the lodge, and then backed Clement Attlee in order to block Morrison. Greenwood was elected to replace Attlee as Deputy Leader.

References

1935 elections in the United Kingdom
1935
Clement Attlee
Labour leadership election
Labour Party leadership election